"Farmer's Daughter" is a song written by Marv Green, Rhett Akins, and Ben Hayslip and recorded by American country music artist Rodney Atkins. It was released in March 2010 as the fourth single from his album It's America, available in June 2010 as a bonus track from the album's re-issue.  The song is also included as an album cut on his 2011 album Take a Back Road.

Background and writing
"This was the first time the three of us had ever gotten together to write," co-writer Rhett Akins told The Boot. "Marv came in with the idea. All he really had was the hook of the song: 'Just when I thought it couldn't get no hotter / I caught a glimpse of the farmer's daughter.' Ben and I jumped all over it. We thought it was awesome."

Music video
The music video was directed by Chris Hicky and premiered on June 16, 2010.

Chart performance
"Farmer's Daughter" debuted at number 96 on the U.S. Billboard Hot 100 chart for the week of July 10, 2010.

Year-end charts

Certifications

References

2010 singles
Rodney Atkins songs
Songs written by Rhett Akins
Songs written by Ben Hayslip
Songs written by Marv Green
Music videos directed by Chris Hicky
Curb Records singles
2009 songs
Songs about farmers